Cubebol synthase (EC 4.2.3.91, Cop4) is an enzyme with systematic name (2E,6E)-farnesyl-diphosphate diphosphate-lyase (cyclizing, cubebol-forming). This enzyme catalyses the following chemical reaction

 (2E,6E)-farnesyl diphosphate + H2O  cubebol + diphosphate

This enzyme requires Mg2+.

References

External links 
 

EC 4.2.3